Valery Petrovich Zhakov (born 1949) is a  Russian film, television and theatre actor.

Biography 
Valery Zhakov born June 21, 1949 in Moscow.

Since 1982 to 1987, Valery Petrovich and his wife Nina Pavlova worked in the Russian Drama Theatre in Yakutsk, in the first youth Echo Theater   (which was created with the direct participation of Zhakov).

In the early '90s he returned to Moscow, where he played in various theaters and then began to act in films.

His main work in the movie itself Valery Petrovich considers the role of Pyotr Shapilin in the trilogy  Alexandrovsky Garden (directed by Aleksey Pimanov and Oleg Ryaskov).

In the new historical film production Amedia Company, The Promised Land by Joseph Stalin,  Conspiracy Marshal,  and Joined them Shepilov  play the role of the Molotov.

Selected filmography
2002 / 2005   A Friendly Family
 2003   Task Resort
2004   Salamander Skin
 2004 At the Corner of the Patriarch's
2004   Blind
2004  Long Farewell
2004 / 2007  Soldiers
2005   Alexandrovsky Garden
2005  Hello, We Are — Your Roof!
 2007 Russian Translation
 2007 The Sovereign's Servant
2007  Three Days in Odessa 
2008   Hunting for Beria
 2008 World War II Behind Closed Doors: Stalin, the Nazis and the West
2010   There is Someone
2011  Joined them Shepilov
2014 Honor Code 7

Personal life
His wife is actress Nina Pavlova.

References

External links

 Valery Zhakov on Facebook

1949 births
Living people
Soviet male stage actors
Russian male film actors
Russian male television actors
Male actors from Moscow
Russian male stage actors
20th-century Russian male actors
21st-century Russian male actors
Soviet male actors
Russian activists against the 2022 Russian invasion of Ukraine